Battaglia (Italian for Battle) may refer to:

Places of Italy
Municipalities
 Battaglia Terme, in the Province of Padua, Veneto
Montebello della Battaglia, in the Province of Pavia, Lombardy
Moriago della Battaglia, in the Province of Treviso, Veneto
Nervesa della Battaglia, in the Province of Treviso, Veneto
San Fermo della Battaglia, in the Province of Como, Lombardy
Sernaglia della Battaglia, in the Province of Treviso, Veneto

Civil parishes
Battaglia (Casaletto Spartano), in the municipality of Casaletto Spartano (SA), Campania
San Martino della Battaglia, in the municipality of Desenzano del Garda (BS), Lombardy

Other uses
 Battaglia (surname)
 Battaglia (genera), a prehistoric sponge
 Battaglia (music), an Italian musical term used in English
 La battaglia di Legnano, an opera of Giuseppe Verdi
 Battaglia pie

See also